French's Tavern, also known as Swan's Creek Plantation, Indian Camp, Harris's Store, and The Coleman Place, is a historic house and tavern located near Ballsville, Powhatan County, Virginia. The two-story, frame building complex is in five distinct sections, with the earliest dated to about 1730.  The sections consist of the main block, the wing, the annex, the hyphen and galleries.  It was built as the manor home for a large plantation, and operated as an ordinary in the first half of the 19th century.

It was added to the National Register of Historic Places in 1989.

References

Houses on the National Register of Historic Places in Virginia
Drinking establishments on the National Register of Historic Places in Virginia
Houses completed in 1730
Houses in Powhatan County, Virginia
National Register of Historic Places in Powhatan County, Virginia
1730 establishments in the Thirteen Colonies